The Premier Bowl is a Group 2 Thoroughbred handicap horse race in Hong Kong, run at Sha Tin over 1200 metres in October. 

Horses rated 90 and above are qualified to enter this race.

Winners

See also
 List of Hong Kong horse races

References 
Racing Post:

 Racing Information of Premier Bowl  (2011/12)
 The Hong Kong Jockey Club 

Horse races in Hong Kong